Newburn station was a railway station serving the village of Newburn, Newcastle upon Tyne. The station was situated at the bottom of Station Road, near Newburn Bridge, and was on the Scotswood, Newburn and Wylam Railway, a branch line of the Newcastle and Carlisle Railway.

History
The station was opened on 12 July 1875. The station ceased to receive passenger trains on 15 September 1958 and was then closed to goods trains on 26 April 1965. The station was then largely demolished, but the tracks were kept intact until the early 1990s, for coal traffic to be delivered to Stella North power station. The platforms and trackbed have now all been removed and made into part of a footpath.

References

External links 

Disused railway stations in Tyne and Wear
Railway stations in Great Britain opened in 1875
Railway stations in Great Britain closed in 1958
Former North Eastern Railway (UK) stations